Charles Geoffrey Nicholas Kay-Shuttleworth, 5th Baron Shuttleworth,  (born 2 August 1948), is a British hereditary peer. He is the son of Charles Ughtred Kay-Shuttleworth, 4th Baron Shuttleworth, and his wife, Anne Elizabeth Phillips.

Lord Shuttleworth was educated at Eton before he was elected FRICS and was a Director of Burnley Building Society from 1979, Chairman of National & Provincial Building Society and Deputy Chairman of Abbey National plc 1996–2004. Following the acquisition of Abbey National plc by Santander he was appointed Chairman of the Santander UK Group Pension Fund from 2005 to 2018. He served as Chairman of the Rural Development Commission, the government agency responsible for the economic and social well-being of the rural areas of England, from 1990 to 1997. He was appointed Lord Lieutenant of Lancashire on 13 January 1997, and he was Chairman of the Association of Lord Lieutenants 2008–2018. He has served as a Member of the Council of the Duchy of Lancaster since 1998 and was appointed Chairman of the Council from 2006 to 2014. 

Lord Shuttleworth was made a Knight Commander of the Royal Victorian Order (KCVO) in the 2011 New Year Honours, in addition to being a Knight of the Order of St John (KStJ). He was appointed a Knight of the Order of the Garter (KG) on 23 April 2016.

The heir apparent to the barony is his son, the Hon. Thomas Kay-Shuttleworth (born 1976).
Lord Shuttleworth is Patron of a number of charitable organisations across Lancashire.

Arms

Styles
 The Hon. Charles Kay-Shuttleworth (1948–1975)
 The Lord Shuttleworth (1975–2011)
 The Lord Shuttleworth KCVO (2011–2016)
 The Lord Shuttleworth KG KCVO (2016–present)

Honours

See also
 Baron Shuttleworth
 https://www.npg.org.uk/collections/search/portrait/mw77567/Charles-Geoffrey-Nicholas-Kay-Shuttleworth-5th-Baron-Shuttleworth?LinkID=mp68153&search=sas&sText=Shuttleworth+&role=sit&rNo=0

Notes

References

External links
 Debrett's People of Today

1948 births
Living people
Barons in the Peerage of the United Kingdom
People educated at Eton College
Lord-Lieutenants of Lancashire
Knights of the Garter
Knights Commander of the Royal Victorian Order
Knights of Justice of the Order of St John
Shuttleworth